Dead cat can refer to:

 Dead cat bounce, a stock market phenomenon
 Dead cat stock, a stock that exhibits such a phenomenon
 Dead Cat Bounce, a comedy band
 Dead cat strategy, a diversionary tactic in debate or news management 
 Dead cat windscreen or dead kitten windscreen, a type of microphone windscreen

See also 
 101 Uses for a Dead Cat, a series of cartoons about dead cats
 Schrödinger's cat, a physics thought experiment involving the possibility of a dead cat